Andhrawala ( Andhrite) is a 2004 Indian Telugu-language action film written and directed by Puri Jagannadh and starring N. T. Rama Rao Jr. playing a dual role, while Rakshitha, Sayaji Shinde, and Rahul Dev play important roles. Music was composed by Chakri while cinematography was handled by Shyam K. Naidu. This film was simultaneously made in Kannada as Veera Kannadiga with Puneeth Rajkumar, directed by Meher Ramesh. The film created much hype as N. T. Rama Rao Jr. was acting in this film just after the blockbuster Simhadri. However the hype was not met and the movie was a flop at the box office.

Plot 
Shankar Pehalvan (N. T. Rama Rao Jr.) is a labor leader from Andhra in Mumbai. He fights with the mafia don Bade Mia (Sayaji Shinde). However, Bade Mia later kills Shankar and his wife (Sanghavi). Basha (Banerjee), a trusted lieutenant of Shankar, takes away his child to rescue him from Bade Mia. When mafia goons follow him, Basha leaves the child on a footpath beside a beggar. The boy, Munna (N. T. Rama Rao Jr.), is raised in a slum area. While Basha is in search of Munna to safeguard him, Bade Mia is in search of him to avenge the death of his son (Mahesh Goyani) in the hands of Shankar. Thanks to the similarities in the appearance of father and son, Basha and Bade Mia recognize that Munna is Shankar's son. Munna gets to know his identity and the story of his father and his death from Basha. Meanwhile, Bade Mia's men descend to Hyderabad to kill Munna. Munna goes to Mumbai to confront Bade Mia. The rest of the story is about how Munna kills his family's murderers.

Cast 

 N. T. Rama Rao Jr. as Munna / Shankar Pehlwaan (double role)
 Rakshitha as Chitra
 Sanghavi as Shankar's wife
 Sayaji Shinde as Bade Mia
 Rahul Dev as Dhanraj
 Pasupathy as Bade's henchman
 Banerjee as Basha
 Nassar as Chitra's father
 Brahmanandam as Home Minister
 Mahesh Goyani as Bade Mia's son
 M. S. Narayana as Dhanraj's assistant 
 Ramaprabha
 Telangana Shakuntala
 Pavala Syamala
 Raghu Babu
 Raghu Kunche
 Ranganath
 Rajiv Kanakala
 Supreeth
 Venu Madhav as Munna's friend
 Jeeva
 Uttej
 G. V. Sudhakar Naidu
 Bandla Ganesh
 Raghava Lawrence (special appearance in the song "Naire Naire")

Music
The music was composed by Chakri and released by Aditya Music.

References

External links

2004 films
2000s Telugu-language films
2004 action films
Indian action films
Films directed by Puri Jagannadh
Films scored by Chakri
Films set in Mumbai
Films shot in Mumbai
Indian multilingual films
2004 multilingual films